Dogs of War is the twelfth studio album by the heavy metal band Saxon, released in 1995.

Track listing

A 2006 CD re-issue on SPV/Steamhammer Records includes two bonus live tracks: "The Great White Buffalo" and "Denim and Leather" recorded in 1995.

Personnel 
 Biff Byford - vocals
 Graham Oliver - guitars (does play, see image https://www.facebook.com/photo/?fbid=10207509181605285&set=a.1456848958824)
 Paul Quinn - guitars
 Nibbs Carter - bass guitar
 Nigel Glockler - drums
 Rainer Hänsel - guitars (guest)

 Production
 Biff Byford  - producer, mixing
 Rainer Hänsel - producer
 Kalle Trapp - mixing engineer
 John Mc Lane - mixing engineer
 Gems Studio in Boston, Lincolnshire, England - recording location
Revolution Studios in Cheadle Hulme
 Karo Studios, Brackel, Germany - mixing location
 Paul R. Gregory - artwork

Charts

References

1995 albums
Saxon (band) albums
Virgin Records albums